Veil of Maya could refer to:

 A Buddhist or Hinduist belief about the world; see Maya (illusion)
 Veil of Maya, an American metalcore band from Chicago
 "Veil of Maya", a song by American progressive rock band Cynic from their 1993 album Focus
 The Veil of Maya, a 2017 Italian romantic comedy-drama film
 "The Veils of Maya", a poem by George William Russell